Bethel Seaplane Base  is a public use seaplane base located on the Kuskokwim River in Bethel, a city in the Bethel Census Area of the U.S. state of Alaska.

The state-owned Bethel Airport is located three nautical miles (5 km) west of this seaplane base. Five nautical miles (9 km) to the south, also on the Kuskokwim River, is the Napaskiak Airport.

Facilities 
Bethel Seaplane Base has one waterway designated NE/SW which measures 3,000 by 500 feet (914 x 152 m). The facility is unattended. There are 15 single-engine aircraft based at this airport.

References

External links 
 FAA Alaska airport diagram (GIF)

Airports in the Bethel Census Area, Alaska
Seaplane bases in Alaska